The men's high jump at the 2012 IAAF World Indoor Championships was held at the Ataköy Athletics Arena on 10 and 11 March.

Medalists

Records

Qualification standards

Schedule

Results

Qualification

Qualification standard: 2.32 m (Q) or at least best 8 qualified (q).  19 athletes from 15 countries participated.  The qualification round started at 11:25 and ended at 13:01.

Final
The final started at 15:31 and ended at 17:10.

References

High Jump
High jump at the World Athletics Indoor Championships